Byung-Chul Han (born 1959) is a South Korean-born philosopher and cultural theorist living in Germany. He was a professor at the Berlin University of the Arts and still occasionally gives courses there.

Life and work 
Byung-Chul Han studied metallurgy at Korea University in Seoul before he moved to Germany in the 1980s to study philosophy, German literature and Catholic theology in Freiburg im Breisgau and Munich. In 1994 he received his doctoral degree at Freiburg with a dissertation on Stimmung, or mood, in Martin Heidegger.

In 2000, he joined the Department of Philosophy at the University of Basel, where he completed his habilitation. In 2010 he became a faculty member at the Karlsruhe University of Arts and Design, where his areas of interest were philosophy of the 18th, 19th and 20th century, ethics, social philosophy, phenomenology, cultural theory, aesthetics, religion, media theory, and intercultural philosophy. From 2012 to 2017 he taught philosophy and cultural studies at the Universität der Künste Berlin (UdK), where he directed the newly established Studium Generale general-studies program.

Han is the author of more than twenty books, the most well known are treatises on what he terms a "society of tiredness", a "society of transparency", and the concept of shanzhai (山寨), a style of imitative variation, whose roots are, he argues, intrinsic to Chinese culture, undermine the distinction often drawn between original and fake, and pre-exist practices which in Western philosophy are called deconstructive.

Han's current work focuses on transparency as a cultural norm created by neoliberal market forces, which he understands as the insatiable drive toward voluntary disclosure bordering on the pornographic. According to Han, the dictates of transparency enforce a totalitarian system of openness at the expense of other social values such as shame, secrecy, and trust.

Until recently, he refused to give radio and television interviews and rarely divulges any biographical or personal details, including his date of birth, in public. He is a Catholic.

Thought
Much of Han's writing is characterised by an underlying concern with the situation encountered by human subjects in the fast-paced, technologically-driven state of late capitalism. The situation is explored in its various facets through his books: sexuality, mental health (particularly burnout, depression, and attention deficit hyperactivity disorder), violence, freedom, technology, and popular culture.

In The Burnout Society, Han characterizes today's society as a pathological landscape of neuronal disorders such as depression, attention deficit hyperactivity disorder, borderline personality and burnout. He claims that they are not "infections" but "infarcts", which are not caused by the negativity of people's immunology, but by an excess of positivity. According to Han, driven by the demand to persevere and not to fail, as well as by the ambition of efficiency, we become committers and sacrificers at the same time and enter a swirl of demarcation, self-exploitation and collapse. "When production is immaterial, everyone already owns the means of production, him- or herself. The neoliberal system is no longer a class system in the proper sense. It does not consist of classes that display mutual antagonism. This is what accounts for the system's stability." 

Han argues that subjects become self-exploiters: "Today, everyone is an auto-exploiting labourer in his or her own enterprise. People are now master and slave in one. Even class struggle has transformed into an inner struggle against oneself." The individual has become what Han calls "the achievement-subject"; the individual does not believe they are subjugated "subjects" but rather "projects: Always refashioning and reinventing ourselves" which "amounts to a form of compulsion and constraint—indeed, to a "more efficient kind of subjectivation and subjugation." As a project deeming itself free of external and alien limitations, the "I" subjugates itself to internal limitations and self-constraints, which are taking the form of compulsive achievement and optimization.

In Agonie des Eros ('Agony of the Eros') Han carries forward thoughts developed in his earlier books The Burnout Society and Transparency Society. Beginning with an analysis of the "Other" Han develops an interrogation of desire and love between human beings. Partly based on Lars von Trier's film "Melancholia", where Han sees depression and overcoming depicted, Han further develops his thesis of a contemporary society that is increasingly dominated by narcissism and self-reference. Han's diagnosis extends even to the point of the loss of desire, the disappearance of the ability to devote to the "Other", the stranger, the non-self. At this point, subjects come to revolve exclusively around themselves, unable to build relationships. Even love and sexuality are permeated by this social change: sex and pornography, exhibition/voyeurism and re/presentation, are displacing love, eroticism, and desire from the public eye. The abundance of positivity and self-reference leads to a loss of confrontation. Thinking, Han states, is based on the "untreaded", on the desire for something that one does not yet understand. It is connected to a high degree with Eros, so the "agony of the Eros" is also an "agony of thought". Not everything must be understood and "liked", not everything must be made available.

In Topologie der Gewalt ('Topology of Violence'), Han continues his analysis of a society on the edge of collapse that he started with The Burnout Society. Focusing on the relation between violence and individuality, he shows that, against the widespread thesis about its disappearance, violence has only changed its form of appearance and now operates more subtly. The material form of violence gives way to a more anonymous, desubjectified, systemic one, that does not reveal itself, as it is merging with its antagonist – freedom. This theme is further explored in "Psychopolitics", where through Sigmund Freud, Walter Benjamin, Carl Schmitt, Richard Sennett, René Girard, Giorgio Agamben, Deleuze/Guattari, Michel Foucault, Michel Serres, Pierre Bourdieu and Martin Heidegger, Han develops an original conception of violence. Central to Han's thesis is the idea that violence finds expression in 'negative' and 'positive' forms (note: these are not normative judgements about the expressions themselves): negative violence is an overtly physical manifestation of violence, finding expression in war, torture, terrorism, etc; positive violence "manifests itself as over-achievement, over-production, over-communication, hyper-attention, and hyperactivity." The violence of positivity, Han warns, could be even more disastrous than that of negativity. "Infection, invasion, and infiltration have given way to infarction."

Themes
Han has written on topics such as attention deficit hyperactivity disorder, borderline personality disorder, burnout, depression, exhaustion, internet, love, multitasking, pop culture, power, rationality, religion, social media, subjectivity, tiredness, transparency and violence.

Reception

Müdigkeitsgesellschaft will soon be available in 19 languages. Several South Korean newspapers voted it to be the most important book in 2012. The Guardian wrote a positive review of his 2017 book Psychopolitics: Neoliberalism and New Technologies of Power, while the Hong Kong Review of Books praised his writing as "concise almost to the point of being aphoristic, Han's writing style manages to distill complex ideas into highly readable and persuasive prose" while noting that "on other occasions, Han veers uncomfortably close to billboard-sized statements ("Neoliberalism is the 'capitalism of' Like), which highlights the fine line between cleverness and self-indulgent sloganeering." The Los Angeles Review of Books described him as "as good a candidate as any for philosopher of the moment."

Der Freitag writer Steffen Kraft criticized him for drawing on anti-democratic and anti-technology Carl Schmitt, and alleged that he "confuses cause and effect: it is not the hope for more transparency that has turned democracy into technocracy, but the refusal of even progressives to consider the consequences of information technology on the political process." (original quote in German: "Ursache und Wirkung: Nicht die Hoffnung auf mehr Transparenz hat die Demokratie zur Technokratie gemacht, sondern die Weigerung selbst Progressiver, die Folgen der Informationstechnik auf den politischen Prozess zu bedenken. ")

Works in English 

 The Burnout Society (Stanford: Stanford University Press, 2015) .
 The Transparency Society (Stanford: Stanford Briefs, 2015) 
 The Agony of Eros (Cambridge, Massachusetts: MIT Press, 2017) 
 In the Swarm: Digital Prospects (Cambridge, Massachusetts: MIT Press, 2017), 
 Psychopolitics: Neoliberalism and New Technologies of Power (London & New York: Verso Books, 2017) 
 Saving Beauty (Cambridge: Polity Press, 2017) 
 The Scent of Time: A Philosophical Essay on the Art of Lingering (Cambridge: Polity Press, 2017) 
 Shanzhai: Deconstruction in Chinese (Cambridge, Massachusetts: MIT Press, 2017) 
 The Expulsion of the Other: Society, Perception and Communication Today (Cambridge: Polity Press, 2018) 
 Topology of Violence (Cambridge, Massachusetts: MIT Press, 2018) 
 What Is Power? (Cambridge: Polity Press, 2018) 
 Good Entertainment: A Deconstruction of the Western Passion Narrative (Cambridge, Mass.: MIT Press, 2019) 
 The Disappearance of Rituals: A Topology of the Present (Cambridge: Polity Press, 2020) 
 Capitalism and the Death Drive (Cambridge: Polity Press, 2021) 
 The Palliative Society: Pain Today (Cambridge: Polity Press, 2021) 
 Hyperculture: Culture and Globalisation (Cambridge: Polity Press, 2022) 
 Infocracy: Digitization and the Crisis of Democracy (Cambridge: Polity Press, 2022) 
 Non-things: Upheaval in the Lifeworld (Cambridge: Polity Press, 2022) 
 The Philosophy of Zen Buddhism (Cambridge: Polity Press, 2022) 
 Absence: On the Culture and Philosophy of the Far East (Cambridge: Polity Press, 2023)

Bibliography
 Heideggers Herz. Zum Begriff der Stimmung bei Martin Heidegger. Wilhelm Fink, Paderborn 1996.
 Todesarten. Philosophische Untersuchungen zum Tod. Wilhelm Fink, Paderborn 1998.
 Portuguese edition: Rostos da Morte: Investigações Filosóficas sobre a Morte, Relógio D'Água Editores, 2021, .
 Martin Heidegger. Eine Einführung. UTB, Stuttgart 1999.
 Tod und Alterität. Wilhelm Fink, Paderborn 2002.
 Brazilian Portuguese edition: Morte e alteridade, Vozes, Petrópolis, 2020 .
 Philosophie des Zen-Buddhismus. Reclam, Stuttgart 2002.
 Brazilian Portuguese edition: Filosofia do zen-budismo, Vozes, Petrópolis, 2020 .
 Portuguese edition: Filosofia do Budismo Zen, Relógio D'Água Editores, 2016, .
 Was ist Macht. Reclam, Stuttgart 2005.
 Brazilian Portuguese edition: O que é poder?, Vozes, Petrópolis, 2019 .
 Korean edition: 《권력이란 무엇인가》. Moonji, 2009, .
Portuguese edition:Sobre o Poder, Relógio D'Água Editores, 2017, .
 Hyperkulturalität: Kultur und Globalisierung. Merve, Berlin 2005. .
 Brazilian Portuguese edition: Hiperculturalidade: cultura e globalização, Vozes, Petrópolis, 2019 .
 Hegel und die Macht. Ein Versuch über die Freundlichkeit. Wilhelm Fink, Paderborn 2005.
 Brazilian Portuguese edition: Hegel e o Poder: Um ensaio sobre amabilidade, Vozes, Petrópolis, 2022 .
 Gute Unterhaltung. Eine Dekonstruktion der abendländischen Passionsgeschichte. Verlag Vorwerk 8, Berlin 2007.
 Abwesen: Zur Kultur und Philosophie des Fernen Ostens. Merve, Berlin 2007. .
 Spanish edition: Ausencia. Acerca de la cultura y la filosofía del Lejano Oriente. Caja Negra Editora, 2019, .
 Duft der Zeit: Ein philosophischer Essay zur Kunst des Verweilens. Transkript 2009.
 Korean edition: 《시간의 향기》. Moonji, 2010, .
 Portuguese edition: O Aroma do Tempo, Relógio D'Água Editores, 2016, .
 Spanish edition: El aroma del tiempo, Herder editorial, Barcelona, 2015, 
 Müdigkeitsgesellschaft Matthes & Seitz, Berlin 2010, .
 Brazilian Portuguese edition: Sociedade do Cansaço, Vozes, Petrópolis, 2015 .
 Catalan edition: La societat del cansament, Herder, Barcelona, 2015 .
 Czech edition: Vyhořelá společnost, Rybka Publishing, 2016, . (essays)
 Danish edition: Træthedssamfundet. Møller, 2012, .
 Dutch edition: De vermoeide samenleving. van gennep, 2012, .
 English edition: The Burnout Society. Stanford UP, 2015, .
 French edition: La Société de la fatigue, édition circé, 2014, .
 Greek edition: in progress, Editions Opera.
 Italian edition: La società della stanchezza. nottetempo, 2012, .
 Japanese edition: 『疲労社会』. 花伝社, 2021.
 Korean edition: 《피로사회》. Moonji, 2011, .
 Macedonian edition: in progress, Tabahon.
 Portuguese edition: A Sociedade do Cansaço, Relógio D'Água Editores, 2014, .
 Romanian edition: in progress, Humanitas.
 Spanish edition: La sociedad del cansancio. Barcelona, Herder Editorial, 2012, .
 Swedish edition: Trötthetssamhället. Ersatz, 2013, .
 Traditional Chinese edition: 《倦怠社會》. Taipei: Locus (大塊), 2015. .
 Turkish edition: in progress, Pinar Yayinlari.
 Shanzhai 山寨 - Dekonstruktion auf Chinesisch. Merve, Berlin 2011, .
 Spanish edition: Shanzhai. El arte de la falsificación y la deconstrucción en China. Buenos Aires, Caja Negra Editora, 2016, .
 Topologie der Gewalt. Matthes & Seitz, Berlin 2011, .
 Brazilian Portuguese edition: Topologia da Violência, Vozes, Petrópolis, 2017 .
 Korean edition: in progress, Moonji.
 Turkish edition: in progress, Metis.
Portuguese edition: Topologia da Violência, Relógio D'Água Editores, 2019, .
 Transparenzgesellschaft. Matthes & Seitz, Berlin 2012, .
 Brazilian Portuguese edition: Sociedade da Transparência, Vozes, Petrópolis, 2017 .
 Catalan edition: La societat de la transparència, Barcelona Herder, 2015, .
 Dutch edition: De transparente samenleving. van gennep, 2012, .
 English edition: The Transparency Society. Stanford UP, 2015, .
 Greek edition: in progress, Editions Opera.
 Italian edition: La società della trasparenza, nottetempo, 2014. 
 Japanese edition: 『透明社会』. 花伝社, 2021.
 Korean edition: 《투명사회》, Moonji, 2014, .
 Portuguese edition: A Sociedade da Transparência, Relógio D'Água Editores, 2014, .
 Romanian edition: in progress, Humanitas.
 Russian edition: in progress, Logos.
 Spanish edition: La sociedad de la transparencia. Barcelona, Herder Editorial, 2013, .
 Agonie des Eros. Matthes & Seitz, Berlin 2012, .
 Brazilian Portuguese edition: Agonia do Eros, Vozes, Petrópolis, 2017 .
 Catalan edition: L'agonia de l'Eros, Barcelona Herder, 2020, .
 Dutch edition: in progress, van gennep.
 English edition: The Agony of Eros. MIT Press, 2017. .
 French edition: Le désir : Ou l'enfer de l'identique, Autrement, 2015, .
 Italian edition: Eros in agonia. nottetempo, 2013, .
 Korean edition: in progress, Moonji.
 Portuguese edition: A Agonia de Eros, Relógio D'Água Editores, 2014, .
 Romanian edition: Agonia erosului, Humanitas, EPUB/PDF .
 Spanish edition: La agonía del Eros. Barcelona, Herder Editorial, 2014. .
 Bitte Augen schließen. Auf der Suche nach einer anderen Zeit. Matthes & Seitz Berlin 2013 ebook, .
 Brazilian Portuguese edition: Favor fechar os olhos, Vozes, Petrópolis, 2021 .
 Digitale Rationalität und das Ende des kommunikativen Handelns. Matthes & Seitz Berlin 2013, .
 Italian edition: Razionalità digitale. La fine dell'agire comunicativo. GoWare edizioni, 2014, 
 Im Schwarm. Ansichten des Digitalen. Matthes & Seitz, Berlin 2013, .
 Brazilian Portuguese edition: No enxame, Vozes, Petrópolis, 2018 .
 English edition: In the Swarm: Digital Prospects. MIT Press, 2017, .
 Spanish edition: En el enjambre. Barcelona, Herder Editorial, 2014, .
Portuguese edition: No Enxame, Relógio D'Água Editores, 2016, .
 French edition: in progress, Actes Sud.
 Italian edition:Nello sciame. Visioni del digitale, nottetempo, 2015. 
 Swedish edition: I svärmen. Tankar om det digitala . Stockholm, Ersatz, 2014. .
 Psychopolitik: Neoliberalismus und die neuen Machttechniken (Essay Collection). S. Fischer Verlag Frankfurt 2014 .
 English edition: Psychopolitics: Neoliberalism and New Technologies of Power. Verso Books, 2017. 
 Portuguese edition: Psicopolítica, Relógio D'Água Editores, 2015, .
 Spanish edition: Psicopolítica. Barcelona, Herder Editorial, 2014, .
 Arabic edition: السيكوبوليطيقا. Beirut, Believers Without Borders, 2020, .
Die Errettung des Schönen. S. Fischer Verlag Frankfurt 2015.
 Brazilian Portuguese edition: A salvação do belo, Vozes, Petrópolis, 2019 .
 Spanish edition: La salvación de lo bello. Barcelona, Herder Editorial, 2015, .
Portuguese edition: A Salvação do Belo, Relógio D'Água Editores, 2016, .
Die Austreibung des Anderen: Gesellschaft, Wahrnehmung und Kommunikation heute. S. Fischer, Berlin, 2016. .
 Brazilian Portuguese edition: A expulsão do outro, Vozes, Petrópolis, 2022 .
Portuguese edition: A Expulsão do Outro, Relógio D'Água Editores, 2018, .
 Close-Up in Unschärfe. Merve, Berlin 2016. .
 Gute Unterhaltung: Eine Dekonstruktion der abendländischen Passionsgeschichte. Matthes & Seitz, Berlin 2017. 
 Brazilian Portuguese edition: Bom entreterimento, Vozes, Petrópolis, 2019 .
Portuguese edition: Entretenimento e Paixão na História do Ocidente, Relógio D'Água Editores, 2019, .
 Lob der Erde: Eine Reise in den Garten. Ullstein, Berlin 2018. .
 Brazilian Portuguese edition: Louvor à Terra: Uma viagem ao jardim, Vozes, Petrópolis, 2022 .
 Vom Verschwinden der Rituale: Eine Topologie der Gegenwart. Ullstein, Berlin 2019. .
 Brazilian Portuguese edition: O desaparecimento dos rituais, Vozes, Petrópolis, 2021 .
 English edition: The Disappearance of Rituals: A Topology of the Present (Cambridge: Polity Press, 2020) .
 Kapitalismus und Todestrieb. Matthes & Seitz, Berlin 2019. .
 Brazilian Portuguese edition: Capitalismo e impulso de morte, Vozes, Petrópolis, 2021 .
 Palliativgesellschaft. Schmerz heute. Matthes & Seitz, Berlin 2020. .
 Brazilian Portuguese edition: Sociedade paliativa, Vozes, Petrópolis, 2021 .
 Undinge: Umbrüche der Lebenswelt. Ullstein, Berlin 2021. .
 Brazilian Portuguese edition: Não coisas: Reviravoltas do mundo da vida, Vozes, Petrópolis, 2022 .
 Infokratie: Digitalisierung und die Krise der Demokratie. Matthes & Seitz, Berlin 2021. .
 Brazilian Portuguese edition: Infocracia: Digitalização e a crise da democracia, Vozes, Petrópolis, 2022 .
 Vita contemplativa. Oder von der Untätigkeit. Ullstein, Berlin 2022. .

References

External links 
 
 Byung-Chul Han's web page at the Staatliche Hochschule für Gestaltung, Karlsruhe
 http://www.udk-berlin.de/sites/content/themen/universitaet/studium_generale/
 Byung-Chul Han, Essay on the ethics of drones
 Interview with Byung-Chul Han in the Sueddeutsche Zeitung
 El espejo intervenido: una conversación entre David Hume y Byung-Chul Han. Revista de Filosofía, 38(97), 2021, pp. 50-70. ISSN 0798-1171
 Prácticas de la amabilidad: una interpretación del pensamiento de Byung-Chul Han. Areté. Revista de Filosofía, 34(2), 2022, pp. 291-318. ISSN 1016-913X
 ¿Lejano Oriente como arma para la revolución? Reflexiones sobre el papel de la filosofía oriental en la obra de Byung-Chul Han. Estudios de Filosofía, 67, 2022, pp. 5-24. ISSN 0121-3628
 Byung-Chul Han: the critique of achievement society in For Work / Against Work Debates on the centrality of work

Living people
1959 births
21st-century German philosophers
Academic staff of the Berlin University of the Arts
German people of South Korean descent
Korea University alumni
Mass media theorists
Philosophers of technology
South Korean emigrants to Germany
South Korean philosophers
South Korean Roman Catholics
Catholic philosophers
German male writers
Hegel scholars
Deconstruction